Gudmund Birger Amundin (20 February 1880 – 22 April 1965) was a Swedish rower who competed in the 1912 Summer Olympics. He was a crew member of the Swedish boat Göteborgs that was eliminated in the first round of the men's eight tournament.

References

1880 births
1965 deaths
Swedish male rowers
Olympic rowers of Sweden
Rowers at the 1912 Summer Olympics